Châteauroux-les-Alpes, locally known as Châteauroux, is a commune in the Hautes-Alpes department, administrative region of Provence-Alpes-Côte d'Azur, southeastern France.

Population

See also
Communes of the Hautes-Alpes department

References

Communes of Hautes-Alpes
Caturiges